Howard Taylor may refer to:
 Howard Taylor (tennis) (1865–1920), American tennis player
 Howard Taylor (cricketer) (1908–1985), English cricketer
 Frederick Howard Taylor (1862–1946), often F. Howard Taylor, British author, speaker, and missionary
 Howard Taylor (1929–2020), older brother of actress Elizabeth Taylor
 Howard Taylor (painter) (1918–2001), Western Australian artist and art teacher
 Howard Taylor (sailor), British sailor at the 1900 Olympics
 Howard D. Taylor (1878–1944), American politician in the state of Washington
 Howard F. Taylor (born 1939), American sociologist
 Howard Taylor (engineer) (1940–2016), British structural engineer

See also
 Howard Tayler (born 1968), creator of the webcomic Schlock Mercenary
 Taylor Howard (1932–2002), American scientist and radio engineer
 Geraldine Taylor (1865–1949), often known as Mrs. Howard Taylor, British Protestant Christian missionary to China
 
 Howard Taylor Ricketts (1871–1910), American pathologist